A crystal is a form of solid matter whose constituent atoms, molecules, or ions are arranged in an orderly repeating pattern. 

Crystal or Crystals may also refer to:

Art, entertainment, and media

Music 
 The Crystals, an American pop music girl group
 Crystal, the artistic name of Gaudelia Díaz

Albums 
 Crystal (Crystal Gayle album), 1976
 Crystal (Ahmad Jamal album), 1987
 Crystal (Double album), 1999
 Crystals (Sam Rivers album), 1974
 Crystals (Eskimo Callboy album), 2015

Songs 
 "Crystal" (song), a song by New Order, 2001
 "Crystals" (song), a song by Of Monsters and Men, 2015
 "Crystal", a song by Fleetwood Mac from their 1975 eponymous album
 "Crystal", a song by Pablo Cruise, 1976
 "Crystal", a song by Frank Ifield, 1979
 "Crystal", a song by Michael Martin Murphey from his 1982 eponymous album
 "Crystal", a song by Nova, 1983
 "Crystal", a song by Elton John from Too Low for Zero, 1983
 "Crystal", a song by Hüsker Dü from Candy Apple Grey, 1986
 "Crystal", a song by Curve from Cuckoo, 1993
 "Crystals", a song by The Badgeman, 1990

Other art, entertainment, and media
 Crystal (comics), a Marvel comic book superheroine
 Crystal (film) an upcoming American film directed by William H. Macy
 Crystal (novel), a 1987 novel by Walter Dean Myers
 Crystal (Cirque du Soleil), a theatrical show featuring ice skating
 "Crystal" (The Secret Circle), a television episode
 "Crystal", a poem by Patti Smith in the Seventh Heaven collection
 Pokémon Crystal, an updated version of Pokémon Gold and Silver released in 2000 for the Game Boy Color
 Crystal Dynamics, an American video game developer

People 
 Crystal (given name), a female given name
 Crystal (surname), a surname

Places 
 Crystal, Colorado
 Crystal, Indiana
 Crystal, Maine
 Crystal, Michigan
 Crystal, Minnesota
 Crystal City, Missouri
 Crystal, Clark County, Nevada
 Crystal, Nye County, Nevada
 Crystal, New Mexico
 Crystal, North Dakota
 Crystal, West Virginia
 Crystal, Wisconsin
 Crystal Lake (disambiguation)
 Crystal Palace (disambiguation)
 Crystal Township, Hancock County, Iowa
 Crystal Township, Tama County, Iowa
 Crystal Township, Montcalm County, Michigan
 Crystal Township, Oceana County, Michigan
 The Crystal, a building in London

Science and engineering 
 Crystal system, a mathematical physics description of crystals.
 Crystal (mathematics), a concept introduced by Grothendieck generalizing quasicoherent sheaves
 Crystal oscillator, an electronic oscillator circuit

Software 
 Crystal (programming language), a Ruby-inspired programming language
 CRYSTAL, a quantum chemistry calculation software
 Digital Research's Graphics Environment Manager (GEM), originally code-named Crystal

Other uses 
 Crystal the Monkey, a female capuchin monkey and animal actress
 Crystal (steamboat), a Puget Sound steamboat that operated in the early 1900s
 MV ACX Crystal, a container ship of the ACX shipping line sometimes simply called "Crystal"
 CRYSTAL, code name for the KH-11 Kennen spy satellites
 Crystal Mover, a people mover system manufactured in Japan by Mitsubishi
Crystal Cathedral, in Garden Grove, CA
 Lead glass, commonly called crystal. Other materials are also employed to create "lead-free crystal glassware".
 Crystal healing, a pseudoscientific alternative medicine technique that uses semiprecious stones and crystals
 Crystal Semiconductor - audio electronics company acquired by Cirrus Logic
Crystal meth, methamphetamine
 Montreal Crystals, a former Canadian ice hockey team

See also 
 Chrystal (disambiguation)
 Cristal (disambiguation)
 Kristallen, meaning The Crystal, the official Swedish television award
 Krystal (disambiguation)